Serena McDonald (born 1 August 2002) is a footballer who plays as a midfielder for Pickering FC in League1 Ontario. Born in Canada, she plays for the Guyana women's national team.

Early life
McDonald played youth soccer with Ajax SC.

Club career
In 2021, McDonald played with Vaughan Azzurri in League1 Ontario, making one appearance.

In 2022, she joined Pickering FC.

International career
McDonald represented Guyana U20 at the 2020 CONCACAF Women's U-20 Championship, scoring her first goal on February 23 against Nicaragua U20.

In 2021, McDonald was named to the senior roster ahead of friendly matches against Puerto Rico. On October 20, he made her debut in a 6–1 loss to Puerto Rico.

See also
List of Guyana women's international footballers

References

External links
York Lions profile

2002 births
Living people
Citizens of Guyana through descent
Guyanese women's footballers
Women's association football forwards
Guyana women's international footballers
Canadian sportspeople of Guyanese descent
Black Canadian women's soccer players
Vaughan Azzurri (women) players
York Lions soccer players
League1 Ontario (women) players
Pickering FC (women) players